Ferit Şahenk (born 1964) is the Chairman of Turkey's Doğuş Group and one of the richest people in Turkey.

Background
Şahenk graduated from The American School in Switzerland (TASIS) and earned his B.A. from Boston College with a degree in Marketing and Human Resources in 1989. After graduation, Şahenk returned to Istanbul, where his father, Ayhan Şahenk (1929–2001), sent him to apprentice at Doğuş' Garanti Bank. After eight years he moved to the holding company, and beginning in 1998, he has acquired two food retail chains and operated NTV by funding the expansion by selling part of the group's Garanti Bank to the public.

Understanding that top talent is essential to running a diverse group, he also created a recruitment division, Humanitas. Revenues for 1999 at privately held Doğuş Group hit $5.7 billion. In May 2000, he instituted centralized back-office operations for Doğuş' multiple banks and is doing the same for its auto dealerships. To its banking business, Şahenk added leasing, insurance and cashback reward schemes like those of Discover Card in the United States – financial services still uncommon in Turkey at the time.

Ferit is married to Diane Sahenk and they have a daughter named Defne. Also his cousin Melis Şahenk is a designer.

Ferit donated 3 million CHF to his alma mater The American School in Switzerland (TASIS) in order to help creating the Ferit Sahenk Fine Arts Center.

The new head of Doğuş Holdings
He attended the Owner/President Program at Harvard University. At the age of 37, Şahenk took over his father's Doğuş (pronounced DOUGH-oosh, literally "birth" in Turkish) Holding after Ayhan Şahenk died of a heart attack in April 2001.

The net worth of the Şahenk conglomerate is around US$ 2.5 billion, with a turnover for 2005 of US$6 billion, employing about 18,000 people. He relinquished some control of the Garanti Bank, selling a quarter of the country's third largest bank to General Electric for $1.6 billion in 2004, which was regarded as an important step towards greater liberalization in the Turkish banking sector, which had been severely affected by the 2001 economic crisis.  He also runs Turkish media properties capturing more than 10 per cent of country's advertising market. The flattering of the government and Turkish PM with his  media company has been widely criticized and protested against by Turkish citizens. Bankrolled Gallipoli, a film about the Turkish military battle against the Allied offensive. On 28 January 2006 Şahenk held a reception during the World Economic Forum meeting in Davos, Switzerland.
In May 2006, Şahenk was elected Chairman of the Executive Board of the Turkish-U.S. Business Council, a Turkish business group that promotes trade and business relationships between the two countries.

Ferit is a Fenerbahçe Fanatik, and has been a board member during Aziz Yıldırım’s presidency between 2000-02. He also sponsored Moussa Sow transfer for the club.

References

External links
 Official website of Doğuş Holding

1964 births
Living people
Date of birth unknown
Turkish businesspeople
Turkish billionaires
People from Niğde
Turkish mass media owners
Ferit
Fenerbahçe S.K. board members
Harvard University alumni
Carroll School of Management alumni